Helldal is a village in Lillesand municipality in Agder county, Norway. Access to the European route E18 highway is just south of Helldal.

References

Villages in Agder
Lillesand